Zalam in Iran may refer to:
 Zalam, Sari (زلم - Zalam)